Robbie McKenzie (born 25 September 1998) is an English professional footballer who plays as a defender for Gillingham.

Club career

Hull City 
McKenzie joined Hull City at the age of nine and signed a scholarship in July 2016. On 22 August 2017, he made his debut in a 2–0 EFL Cup defeat to Doncaster Rovers. On 28 February 2018, McKenzie signed a two-year contract with the club.

Following the relegation of the club at the end of the 2019–20 season to League One, McKenzie was released by the club.

Gillingham
On 21 August 2020, McKenzie joined Gillingham on a free transfer following his release from Hull City. Following the Gills' relegation to League Two, McKenzie was offered a new contract at the end of the 2021–22 season which was initially rejected. However, having failed to find a new club, he re-signed for Gillingham on transfer deadline day.

Statistics

References 

1998 births
Living people
English footballers
Association football midfielders
Hull City A.F.C. players
Gillingham F.C. players
English Football League players
Footballers from Kingston upon Hull